Discoverer 21, also known as RM-2, was an American satellite which was launched in 1961. It was a technology demonstration spacecraft, based on an Agena-B.

The launch of Discoverer 21 occurred at 22:58 UTC on 18 February 1961. A Thor DM-21 Agena-B rocket was used, flying from launch pad 75-3-5 at the Vandenberg Air Force Base. Upon successfully reaching orbit, it was assigned the Harvard designation 1961 Zeta 1.

It remained in orbit until 20 April 1962, when it decayed and reentered the atmosphere.

References

Spacecraft launched in 1961
Spacecraft which reentered in 1962